The Senate Subcommittee on Primary Health & Retirement Security is one of the three subcommittees within the Senate Committee on Health

Jurisdiction
The Subcommittee has oversight over many aging issues including: The Older Americans Act - including home delivered and congregate meals programs for older adults, the Senior Community Services Employment Program, long-term services and supports, elder abuse, neglect, and scams affecting seniors, and the health of the aging population, including Alzheimer's disease and family care-giving. The Subcommittee also has oversight over many Primary Health issues including Community Health Centers, access to vaccines, oral health, prescription drugs and the mental health of all Americans.

Members, 118th Congress

Historical subcommittee rosters

117th Congress

References

External links
Committee on Health and Retirement Security Subcommittee page

Health Primary Health and Retirement Security

Parliamentary committees on Healthcare